Osceola Township is the name of some places in the U.S. state of Michigan:

 Osceola Township, Houghton County, Michigan
 Osceola Township, Osceola County, Michigan

See also 
 Oceola Township, Michigan
 Osceola County, Michigan

Michigan township disambiguation pages